Miramichi Bay-Neguac is a provincial electoral district for the Legislative Assembly of New Brunswick, Canada.  It was formerly known more simply as Miramichi Bay. The riding was created from part of the multi-member Northumberland riding, and was first contested in 1974.  At the 2013 boundary adjustment, the riding moved western and inland taking in the northeast parts of the City of Miramichi and rural areas to the north and west of the city.

The riding's previous representative in the Legislative Assembly was Carmel Robichaud of the Liberal Party. Roger Duguay, leader of the New Democratic Party from 2007 to 2010, was that party's candidate in Miramichi Bay-Neguac in the 2006 provincial election.

Lisa Harris of the Liberal Party was elected in the September 2014 provincial election.

Members of the Legislative Assembly

Election results

Miramichi Bay-Neguac 

|-

|-

Miramichi Bay

References

External links 
Website of the Legislative Assembly of New Brunswick
Map of Miramichi Bay-Neguac riding as of 2018

Politics of Miramichi, New Brunswick
New Brunswick provincial electoral districts
1973 establishments in New Brunswick